4-Pyrone (γ-pyrone or pyran-4-one) is an unsaturated cyclic chemical compound with the molecular formula C5H4O2.  It is isomeric with 2-pyrone.

Preparation
4-Pyrone is prepared via the thermal decarboxylation of chelidonic acid.

Reactions
4-Pyrone and its derivatives react with amines in protic solvents to form 4-Pyridones.

Derivatives
4-Pyrone forms the central core of several natural chemical compounds, including maltol, meconic acid, kojic acid, and of the important class of the Flavones.

{| class="wikitable"
|
|
|-
| Maltol
| Kojic acid
|}

See also
 Pyrone
 4-Pyridone
 Dehydroacetic acid

References